213 is a year of the Julian calendar.

213 may also refer to:

 213 (number), a natural number
 213 BC, a year of the pre-Julian Roman calendar
 213 Lilaea, a Main belt asteroid
 213 series, a type of train used by Japan National Railways
 Area code 213, a telephone area code for downtown Los Angeles and environs
 Two:Thirteen, a 2009 suspense thriller film 
 213, the apartment number of American serial killer Jeffrey Dahmer

Music
 213 (group), a hip hop group consisting of Snoop Dogg, Warren G & Nate Dogg
 "213", a song by Slayer from Divine Intervention
 "213 (Maritime.epsosis)", a song by Squarepusher from Conumber E:P

Military units
 213 Coastal Division, an Infantry Division of the Italian Army during World War II
 213th Battalion (American Legion), CEF, a unit in the Canadian Expeditionary Force during World War I
 213th Area Support Group (United States), a unit of the Pennsylvania Army National Guard

See also 
 2.13.61, a record company founded by Henry Rollins